= Aurangabad coalfield =

Location
- Location: Bihar, India

Production
- Products: Coal

The Aurangabad is a large coal field located in the east of India in Bihar. Aurangabad represents one of the largest coal reserve in India having estimated reserves of 3 billion tonnes of coal.

Coal Field	Proved	Indicated	Inferred	Total
Aurangabad	213.88	2279.82	503.41	2997.11
